Chris Gilbert was an American football player. 

Gilbert ran for 3,231 yards in 29 games for the University of Texas in 1966–68. He was the first player in NCAA history to record three 1,000-yard rushing seasons—rushing for 1,080 as a sophomore, 1,019 as a junior, 1,132 as a senior, averaging 5.4 yards per rushing attempt. He was All-Southwest Conference three times and consensus All-America in 1968. In his career, he returned 20 kickoffs, averaging 22.7 yards on each and scored 28 touchdowns in 29 games. He was drafted by the New York Jets in the fifth round of the 1969 NFL Draft but never played in the NFL. He was elected to the College Football Hall of Fame in 1999.

References 

1946 births
Living people
All-American college football players
Texas Longhorns football players
College Football Hall of Fame inductees
Players of American football from Houston